Kinderhook may refer to:

Places in the United States
 Kinderhook, Illinois
 Kinderhook (town), New York
 Kinderhook (village), New York, in the above town
 Kinderhook, Ohio
 Kinderhook Creek, a tributary of the Hudson River, New York
 Kinderhook Township, Pike County, Illinois
 Kinderhook Township, Michigan, in Branch County

Other
 Kinderhook Industries, American private equity firm
 Kinderhook plates, a hoax perpetrated on 19th century Mormons
 "Old Kinderhook", a name applied to U.S. President Martin Van Buren